Mizar is the eponymous debut studio album by the rock band Mizar. It was released in 1988 on Helidon record label. This is the first major rock record in Macedonian.

In 1997, it was re-released as Svedozhba, on CD and cassette with bonus live and demo tracks. The versions of the album tracks on Svedozhba are taken from vinyl. Goran Tanevski was the only Mizar member involved with the project.

In 2003, this album and Svjat Dreams were remastered and rereleased, containing live and demo tracks.

Track listing 

A music video was filmed for "Hoden že", showing the band playing the song in front of a church.

"Slavjani", "Dožd po doždot" and "Gradot e nem" are from a Mizar demo tape in 1988. "Doždot" was recorded live at the Kurshumli An in 1990.

On "Svedožba", "Čifte čamče", "Samo eden mig" and "Veligden" are taken from the Kurshumli An concert in 1990. "Svjat Dreams" is a darker sounding version of the final track, recorded in 1989. "1762", "Dumanje" and "Abja mem" are all taken from Svjat Dreams.

External links 
 Mizar on Discogs (list of versions)

Mizar (band) albums
1988 debut albums